Dorcadion murrayi is a species of beetle in the family Cerambycidae. It was described by Küster in 1847. It is known from Romania, Hungary, Croatia, and Serbia.

References

murrayi
Beetles described in 1847